The 2002 ICC Americas Championship was a cricket tournament in Argentina, taking place between 12 March and 16 March 2002. It gave six North and South American Associate and Affiliate members of the International Cricket Council experience of international one-day cricket.

Teams

There were 6 teams that played in the tournament. These teams were non-test member nations of the Americas Cricket Association. The teams that played were:

Squads

Group stage

Points Table

Match details

Statistics

International cricket competitions in 2002
ICC Americas Championship
2002 in South American sport
Sports competitions in Buenos Aires
International cricket competitions in Argentina
March 2002 sports events in South America